Christo Wagenaar (born 11 March 1952 in Krugersdorp, Gauteng, South Africa) is a former South African rugby union player.

Playing career
Wagenaar played for Northern Transvaal in the South African provincial competitions. He was part of the Northern Transvaal team that won the Currie Cup in 1975, 1977, 1978 and 1981. Wagenaar played in only one test for the Springboks which was against the World XV on 27 August 1977 at Loftus Versfeld in Pretoria.

Test history

Accolades
Wagenaar was one of the five Young Players of the Year in 1975, along with Tommy du Plessis, Hermanus Potgieter, De Wet Ras and Corrie Pypers

See also
List of South Africa national rugby union players – Springbok no. 491

References

1952 births
Living people
Alumni of Monument High School
South African rugby union players
South Africa international rugby union players
Blue Bulls players
People from Krugersdorp
Rugby union players from Gauteng
Rugby union centres